Karaikal Natesa Dhandayudhapani Pillai (born 14 July 1921, Karaikal - 1974) was an Indian classical dancer and choreographer, considered by many as one of the leading exponents of the classical dance form of Bharatanatyam. He was also a teacher and trained multiple performers.

Career
Born on 14 July 1921 in Karaikal, in the Indian union territory of Puducherry to A. K. Natesa Pillai, a known musician, he started training initially in music under his father, but later turned to Bharatanatyam and learned under his grandfather, who was a teacher of the dance form. Subsequently, he joined Kalakshetra of Rukmini Devi Arundale as a teacher where he taught for a number of years. He was known to have authored several compositions for Bharatanatyam and trained many students; Sri Vidya,  J. Jayalalithaa, Hema Rajagopalan, Suganthi Sadayane, Nayana Shenoy, Adyar K. Lakshman, Uma Muralikrishna, Vijayalakshmi Shetty-Ahuja, Jayalakshmi Alva and Geeta Chandran are some of the notable ones among them. He was the dance choreographer of a number of films in Telugu, Tamil and Hindi such as Raja Guruvu, Man-Mauji, Chhaya, Hum Panchhi Ek Daal Ke, Sri Kalahastiswara Mahatyam and Bhai-Bhai. He also founded Sri Rama Nataka Niketan, a dance academy in Chennai in 1967. The Government of India awarded him the fourth highest civilian honour of the Padma Shri, in 1971, for his contributions to Dance.

Personal life
His wife, Chandra Dhandayudhapani Pillai, is a known Bharatanatyam expert and teacher Her younger Sister Suria Santhanam also a noted Bharatanatyam teacher for 35 Years.

Death 

He went to an eye operation in America. Following his return on 4 October, he attended his student's graduation ceremony. Later he had chest pain and was admitted to the hospital. On 12 October he died.

See also 

Sri Thandauthapanipillai was a famous bharathanatyam dancer as wells as a professional vocalist. He was born into a musical family. His grandfather was called Ramakrishnan, who was a great Bharathanaatyam artist.

References

External links 
 
 

Recipients of the Padma Shri in arts
1921 births
Year of death missing
Tamil artists
Indian male dancers
Bharatanatyam exponents
Indian choreographers
Dancers from Puducherry
20th-century Indian dancers
People from Karaikal